The Ananke group is a group of retrograde irregular satellites of Jupiter that follow similar orbits to Ananke and are thought to have a common origin.

Their semi-major axes (distances from Jupiter) range between 19.3 and 22.7 Gm, their orbital inclinations between 145.7° and 154.8°, and their orbital eccentricities between 0.02 and 0.28.

The core members include (negative period indicates retrograde orbit):

The International Astronomical Union (IAU) reserves names ending in -e for all retrograde moons, including this group's members.

Origin
The Ananke group is believed to have been formed when an asteroid was captured by Jupiter and subsequently fragmented by a collision. This belief is founded on the fact that the dispersion of the mean1 orbital parameters of the core members is very small and can be accounted for by a small velocity impulse (15 < δV < 80 m/s), compatible with a single collision and breakup.

Based on the sizes of the satellites, the original asteroid may have been about 28 km in diameter. Since this value is near the approximate diameter of Ananke itself, it is likely the parent body was not heavily disrupted.

Available photometric studies put this in doubt, however, and suggest that secular resonance has mixed the Ananke and Pasiphae groups: three of the moons of the former family (Harpalyke, Praxidike and Iocaste) display similar grey colours (average colour indices:  B−V = 0.77 and V−R = 0.42) while Ananke itself is on the boundary between grey and light red.

1Osculating orbital parameters of irregular satellites of Jupiter change widely in short intervals due to heavy perturbation by the Sun. For example, changes of as much as 1 Gm in semi-major axis in 2 years,  0.5 in eccentricity in 12 years, and as much as 5° in 24 years have been reported. 
Mean orbital elements are the averages calculated by the numerical integration of current elements over a long period of time, used to determine the dynamical families.

References

External links

 
Moons of Jupiter
Irregular satellites
Moons with a retrograde orbit